Ballee (from Irish Baile Aodha, meaning "Hugh’s townland") is a townland, containing a large housing estate off the Antrim Road in South Ballymena, County Antrim, in Northern Ireland.

History
The Ballee estate is divided into different separate estates; Drumtara to the south, Lettercreeve to the north, Shanlieve and Shancoole to the West, and Shanowen, Kincora and Lanntara to the East. Lettercreeve comprises mainly rows of two or three-storey terraced houses parallel to the street, or in the Radburn layout with some of the terraced houses not facing the street, but onto a pedestrian path, as well as some 2 storey blocks of flats. Shanlieve and Shancoole comprise distinctively-shaped buildings from single-storey Bungalows up to three storey blocks of flats. Much of the Kincora and especially Shanowen areas have been demolished in recent years, leaving green spaces behind. These areas, as well as Drumtara and Lanntara, also consist of distinctively-shaped buildings from single-storey Bungalows up to two storey houses and blocks of flats.

In 2001, Drumtara was 0-10% Catholic, while the rest of the Ballee estate was 10-20% Catholic.

Amenities
In the estate there are many grassy areas, often where houses have been demolished, a park, Ballee Primary School which closed in 2010, a public house and a few retail premises. Near the estate on the Old Antrim Road is Ballee Presbyterian Church, as well as Ballee Baptist Church, on the Toome Road in the townland, near to Ballymena Free Presbyterian Church, which is also in Ballee townland. Ballee Community High School was a state secondary school in Ballee that closed in 2014. Camphill Primary School is now the only primary school in the townland.

Culture
Ballee has its own flute band "Ballee Flute Band" with black and red attire for their uniform. Most people who live in Ballee are from a Protestant background. Every year on the night before the 12th of July, a large bonfire is lit in Ballee near Drumtara. At this time of year, red, white and blue bunting, Union Flags, Ulster Banners and paramilitary flags of the RHC or the UVF are flown from homes or on lampposts, as well as many other loyalist flags.

References

Housing estates in Northern Ireland
Ballymena
County Antrim
Townlands of County Antrim